This list comprises all players who have participated in at least one league match for the Richmond Kickers since the USL began keeping archived records in 2003. Players who were on the roster but never played a first team game are not listed; players who appeared for the team in other competitions (US Open Cup, CONCACAF Champions League, etc.) but never actually made a USL appearance are noted at the bottom of the page where appropriate.

A "†" denotes players who only appeared in a single match.

A "*" denotes players who are known to have appeared for the team prior to 2003.

A
  Trey Alexander
  Dian Anguelov *
  Steve Ankiel

B
  Shaka Bangura
  Ian Bennett
  Matt Bobo
  Chris Brown
  Tim Brown
  David Bulow
  Adrian Bumbut
  Michael Burke
  Peter Byaruhanga

C
  Michael Callahan
  Danny Care *
  Chris Carrieri
  Brian Carroll
  Anthony Catalano
  McColm Cephas
  Adam Chavez
  Leigh Cowlishaw
  Kenny Cutler

D
  Fabian Dawkins
  Matthew Delicâte
  Dwayne De Rosario *
  John DiRaimondo
  Keith Donohue *
  Gerson dos Santos
  Ihor Dotsenko
  Eric Dutt

E
  Kevin Edwards
  Edson Elcock
  Derrick Etienne Sr. *

F
  Armando Femia
  Dennis Fenemore
  Marco Ferruzzi *
  Bobby Foglesong
  Chris Fox

G
  John Gilkerson
  Daryl Gomez
  Ray Goodlett
  Sascha Görres

H
  Evan Harding
  Tim Hardy
  Jeff Hare
  Ed Hayden
  David Hayes
  Ryan Heins
  Josh Henderson
  Will Hesmer
  Nozomi Hiroyama
  Charlie Howe
  Ben Hunter

J
  Nowaf Jaman
  Kevin Jeffrey
  Kelvin Jones
  Ryan Jones

K
  Henry Kalungi
  Steve Kinsey *
  Kevin Knight
  Adu-Gyamfi Kwaku *

L
  John Latting
  Paul Lekics
  Cecil Lewis
  Peter Luzak

M
  Pete Marino †*
  Ross MacKenzie
  Matthew Mbuta
  Trevor McEachron
  Andrew Metcalf
  Ruben Mingo
  Brian Morris
  Mark Murphy
  Bret Myers

N
  Bryan Namoff
  Cristian Neagu
  Caleb Norkus
  Theophidack Nti
  Stanley Nyazamba

O
  Matthew O'Toole

P
  Ralph Pace
  Ronnie Pascale
  Eliot Paschalis
  Matthew Pauls
  Anthony Peters
  Matthew Pilkington

R
  David Rosenbaum
  Jason Russell
  Neil Ryan

S
  Ricky Schramm
  Gregory Simmonds
  Clyde Simms
  Freddie Smith
  Robert Ssejjemba
  Khary Stockton
  Benjamin Strawbridge
  Dustin Swinehart

T
  David Testo
  Jeremy Tolleson †

U
  Rob Ukrop

V
  Luke Vercollone
  Joseph Vidmar
  Patrick Viray

W
  Jamel Wallace
  Mali Walton
  Doug Warren
  Matt Watson
  Yomby William
  Anthony Williams
  Paul Williams
  Richie Williams
  Tony Williams
  Steven Wolfe
  Joey Worthen

Sources

Richmond Kickers
 
Association football player non-biographical articles